Volkmar Klein (born 13 January 1960 in Siegen, North Rhine-Westphalia) is a German politician of the Christian Democratic Union (CDU). He is a member of the German Bundestag since 2009 and was a member of the Landtag of North Rhine-Westphalia from 1995 until 2009.

Early life and education 
Parallel to his studies in the University of Bonn, Klein worked as an assistant to a member of the German Bundestag. In 1986, Klein finished his studies in the University of Bonn as a graduate economist and took on a several month internship in the consulting company Henkell Brothers in Melbourne, Australia.

After returning to Germany, Klein continued working for the same Australian consulting company as a freelancer. From 1988 until 1989, Klein was the branch manager of another Australian company Exicom Ltd (electronic company) in Düsseldorf.
From 1989 until 1995, Klein was the executive manager of the Wittgensteiner Kuranstalt GmbH & Co. KG, an operator of rehabilitation clinics and hospitals in Germany and the Czech Republic.

Political career

Career in state politics
In 1978, Klein became a member of the CDU. He has been a member of the federal board of the CDU since 2001 and the chairman of the CDU in the district of Siegen-Wittgenstein since 2003.

From 2004 until 2015 he was the chairman of the federal board of the Protestant Working Group of the CDU in North-Rhine-Westphalia. From 1984 until 2005, he was a member of the council of the Burbach municipality and from 1992 until 1996, he was the mayor of this municipality.

Klein was a member of the Landtag of North Rhine-Westphalia from 1995 until 2009, where, in the 14th legislative period, he was a member of the Budget control committee, Budget committee, Finance committee and the Subcommittee of the Budget- and Finance committee "Personnel“. Besides that he was the speaker of his party in the Budget and Finance committees.

Member of the German Parliament, 2009–present
In the 2009 national elections, Klein was directly elected with 41.53% votes into the German Parliament, followed by 45.8% votes in the federal election in 2013. In his first two legislative terms in the German Parliament, he served on the Budget Committee and the Subcommittee on European Union issues.

Klein also was a member of the parliamentary Financial market committee, a committee that monitored the federal bank rescue package worth 480 billion euros passed on 17 October 2008 and advised on fundamental and strategic issues as well as long-term developments in financial market policy.
In 2017 Klein was directly elected with 40,13% votes into the German Bundestag. In the current, 19th legislative period of the German Parliament, he is the Chairman of the Economic Cooperation and Development Task Force of the CDU/CSU parliamentary group, member of the Committee on Economic Cooperation and Development, Deputy member of the Budget Committee and deputy member of the Committee on Foreign Affairs.

In addition to his committee assignments, Klein chairs the German-Pacific Parliamentary Friendship Group of the German Bundestag.

Other activities 
 German Network against Neglected Tropical Diseases (DNTDs), Member of the Parliamentary Advisory Board (since 2018)
 University of Siegen, Member of the Board of Trustees
 German Africa Foundation, Member of the Board
 Friends of the Siegerland Airport Dreiländereck, Member of the Board
 Foundation for Basic Values and International Understanding, Deputy Chairman
 Central Council of Oriental Christians in Germany, Deputy Chairman of the Advisory Board
 Development and Peace Foundation (SEF), Member of the Board of Trustees
 German Foundation for World Population (DSW), Member of the Parliamentary Advisory Board
 GIZ, Member of the supervisory board (until 2018)

Personal life 
Klein is married and has four children. He lives in the town of Burbach.

References 

1960 births
Living people
People from Siegen
Members of the Bundestag for North Rhine-Westphalia
Members of the Landtag of North Rhine-Westphalia
University of Bonn alumni
Members of the Bundestag 2021–2025
Members of the Bundestag 2017–2021
Members of the Bundestag 2013–2017
Members of the Bundestag 2009–2013
Members of the Bundestag for the Christian Democratic Union of Germany